Nowa Wola  is a small village in the administrative district of Gmina Lesznowola, within Piaseczno County, Masovian Voivodeship, in east-central Poland.

References

Nowa Wola